A debt is that which one party owes to a second party.

Debt or The Debt may also refer to:

Films 
 The Debt (1917 film), a film
 The Debt (1993 film), a drama short film by Bruno de Almeida
 The Debt (1997 film), a Colombian submission for the Academy Award for Best Foreign Language Film
 The Debt (1999 film) or Dług, winner of the 2000 Polish Academy Award for Best Film
 The Debt (2003 film), a British television film directed by Jon Jones
 The Debt (2007 film), an Israeli drama-thriller film
 The Debt (2010 film), an American remake of the Israeli film
 The Debt (2014 film), an American short drama film
 The Debt (2015 film), a Peruvian, Spanish, and American drama film

Literature
 Debt: The First 5000 Years (2011), a book by anthropologist David Graeber

Television 
 Debt (game show), a 1990s American game show
 "Debt" (Law & Order: Special Victims Unit), an episode of Law & Order: Special Victims Unit

See also